The Letters is a 1973 American made-for-television drama film starring John Forsythe, Jane Powell, Dina Merrill, Leslie Nielsen and Barbara Stanwyck. It premiered as the ABC Movie of the Week on March 6, 1973.

It was followed by a sequel, Letters from Three Lovers (1973).

Plot
The lives of three families (the Andersons, the Parkingtons and the Forresters) are affected by a year-long delay in the arrival of mail.

Cast

The Andersons segment: "Dear Elaine"
John Forsythe as Paul Anderson
Henry Jones as The Mailman
Jane Powell as Elaine Anderson
Lesley Ann Warren as Laura Reynolds
Trish Mahoney as Stewardess
Gary Dubin as Paul Anderson Jr.
Mia Bendixsen as Lisa

The Parkingtons segment: "Dear Penelope"
Dina Merrill as Penelope Parkington
Leslie Nielsen as Derek Childs
Barbara Stanwyck as Geraldine Parkington
Gil Stuart as Michael
Orville Sherman as Minister

The Forresters segment: "Dear Mrs. Forrester"
Pamela Franklin as Karen Forrester
Ida Lupino as Mrs. Forrester
Ben Murphy as Joe Randolph
Shelley Novack as Sonny
Frederick Herrick as Billy
Ann Noland as Sally
Brick Huston as Officer
Charles Picerni as 1st Man

References

External links

The Letters at Moviefone

1973 television films
1973 films
1973 drama films
American drama films
ABC Movie of the Week
ABC Motion Pictures films
Films produced by Aaron Spelling
Films directed by Paul Krasny
Films directed by Gene Nelson
1970s American films